This article shows the women's squads of the participating teams at the 2012 Asian Women's Cup Volleyball Championship.

















References

European Games
Asian volleyball championships women's squads